Pierre de Cossé Brissac, 12th Duke of Brissac (13 March 1900 – 4 April 1993), was a French aristocrat and author who wrote historical memoirs. He held the French noble title of Duke of Brissac from 1944 to 1993.

Early life 
He was born in 1900 in Paris, France. His father, François de Cossé Brissac, was the 11th Duke of Brissac from 1883 to 1944. His mother was Mathilde de Crussol d'Uzès, younger daughter of the 12th Duke of Uzès and his wife, Anne de Rochechouart de Mortemart.

Career
He wrote historical memoirs, and four of his memoirs were about his family, the Dukes of Brissac.

Personal life

In 1924, he married Marie Zélie Antoinette Eugénie Schneider (1902–1999), known as May Schneider, the daughter of French industrialist Eugène Schneider II.

They were the parents of two sons and two daughters:
 Marie-Pierre de Brissac (b. 1925), who married Simon Nora in 1947. They divorced in 1954 and she married, secondly, Maurice Herzog in 1964.
 François de Cossé-Brissac, 13th Duke of Brissac (1929–2021), who married Jacqueline Alice de Contades, daughter of Count André de Contades and Daisy Thome, in 1958.
 Giles de Cossé-Brissac (1935–2001).
 Elvire de Brissac (b. 1939), a novelist.

He died in 1993 in Paris.

Distinctions
 Grand Master of the Order of Saint Lazarus (statuted 1910)

Published works
La duchesse d'Uzès (Paris, Gründ, 1950, 201 pages).
Les Brissac, Maison de Cossé (Paris: Éditions Fasquelle, 1973, 448 pages).
A la Billebaude à travers l'Yveline (Chaumont, France: Éditions Crépin-Leblond, 1955, 214 pages).
Chasse  (Chaumont, France: Éditions Crépin-Leblond, 1957, 109 pages).
Nord Kapp ou la Norvège vue par un Français (Paris: Éditions Del Duca, 1967).
En d'autres temps (1900-1939) (Paris: Grasset, 1972, 455 pages).
La suite des temps (1939-1958) (Paris: Grasset, 1974).
Le temps qui court (1959-1974) (Paris: Grasset, 1977).
Le château d'en face (1974-1985) (Paris: Grasset, 1986).

References

1900 births
1993 deaths
Writers from Paris
People from Maine-et-Loire
Pierre
Grand Masters of the Order of Saint Lazarus (statuted 1910)
20th-century French memoirists